The Chapelle expiatoire ("Expiatory Chapel") is a chapel located in the 8th arrondissement of Paris, France. The chapel was constructed on the grounds where King Louis XVI and Queen Marie Antoinette had been buried after they had been guillotined, and it is therefore dedicated to them.

The closest métro station is Saint-Augustin  .

History and construction
The chapel was designed in 1816 by the French Neo-Classical architect Pierre François Léonard Fontaine, who, with his partner Charles Percier, figured among Napoleon's favourite architects. Fontaine's assistant Louis-Hippolyte Lebas oversaw the construction. The chapel was partly constructed on the grounds of the former Madeleine Cemetery, where King Louis XVI and Queen Marie Antoinette had been buried after they had been guillotined.

King Louis XVIII shared the 3 million livres expense of building the Chapelle expiatoire with the Duchess of Angoulême. Construction took ten years, and the chapel was inaugurated in 1826 in the presence of King Charles X. When he blessed the cornerstone of the Chapelle expiatoire, Hyacinthe-Louis de Quelen, Archbishop of Paris, called in vain for an amnesty of the exiled members of the National Convention.

Building and courtyard

The Chapelle expiatoire stands on a slight rise. There are two buildings separated by a courtyard which is surrounded by an enclosed cloister-like precinct, a peristyle, that isolates the chapel from the outside world. The building on Rue Pasquier is the entrance. There is an inscription above the entrance, which reads (translated):

In the courtyard are cenotaphs to those who were known to be buried in this location.

The chapel itself is entered through a pedimented tetrastyle portico, of a sombre Doric order. It contains a domed space at the center of a Greek cross, formed by three coffered half-domed apses with oculi that supplement the subdued natural light entering through the skylight of the main dome. The cubic, semicylindrical and hemispheric volumes recall the central planning of High Renaissance churches as much as they do a Greco-Roman martyrium.  White marble sculptures of the king and queen in ecstatic attitudes were made by François Joseph Bosio and Jean-Pierre Cortot. There is also a bas-relief by French sculptor François-Antoine Gérard (who also did some of the other carvings) showing the exhumation and removal of the remains of Louis XVI and Marie Antoinette to the Basilica of St Denis.

The crypt contains a black and white marble altar intended to mark the place where the royal remains were found.

The Chapelle expiatoire is without doubt the most uncompromising late neoclassical religious building of Paris. Chateaubriand found it "the most remarkable edifice in Paris". The chapel's severe geometry is unrelieved by sculpture, as can be seen by the view from rue d'Anjou.

Later history
In 1862, the cypresses which surrounded the chapel were cut down, and a public park (Square Louis XVI) was created around the complex.

In May 1871 the Paris Commune demanded that the Chapel be torn down. This was never put into effect.

Every January 21, a memorial mass is held in the chapel to commemorate the death of Louis XVI.

The Chapel was severely damaged by storm in 2009.

Photographs

References

External links

Chapelle expiatoire on the Centre des Monuments Nationaux website
Monum: Chapelle Expiatoire
Expiatoire/info.html Paris Pages: Chapelle Expiatoire
Website of novelist Catherine Delors

1826 establishments in France
Cemeteries in Paris
Roman Catholic churches completed in 1826
Roman Catholic churches in the 8th arrondissement of Paris
Roman Catholic chapels in Paris
Votive churches
Monuments of the Centre des monuments nationaux
19th-century Roman Catholic church buildings in France